Podslivnica is a small village below the northern slopes of Mount Slivnica in the Municipality of Cerknica in the Inner Carniola region of Slovenia.

Church

The local church in the settlement is dedicated to Saint Francis Xavier and belongs to the Parish of Cerknica.

References

External links

 Podslivnica on Geopedia

Populated places in the Municipality of Cerknica